Giorgos Abalof (born 5 January 1982) is a Russian-born Greek fencer. He competed in the individual épée event at the 2004 Summer Olympics.

References

1982 births
Living people
Greek male fencers
Olympic fencers of Greece
Fencers at the 2004 Summer Olympics
Russian emigrants to Greece